Wilson, Maryland  may refer to the following places in Maryland:
Wilson-Conococheague, Maryland, a census-designated place
Wilson, Calvert County, Maryland, an unincorporated community
Wilson (ghost town), Calvert County, Maryland
Wilson, Garrett County, Maryland, an unincorporated community
Wilson, Maryland and West Virginia, an unincorporated community in Garrett County